The McAllen Toros was a proposed professional indoor football team to begin play in the Lone Star Football League in the 2013 season.  Based in McAllen, Texas, the Toros play their home games at the State Farm Arena in nearby Hidalgo.

The Toros were the third indoor football team to call the Rio Grande Valley home, following the af2's Rio Grande Valley Dorados which played from 2004 until the league's final season of 2009 and the Rio Grande Valley Magic which played in the Southern Indoor Football League and the LSFL for the 2010 and 2011 seasons.  In addition, though playing in the State Farm Center as the previous two did, the Toros are the first to represent McAllen in their city name. However, the team never played.

References

External links
 McAllen Toros official website

McAllen, Texas
Former Lone Star Football League teams
Defunct American football teams in Texas
Sports in the Rio Grande Valley
American football teams established in 2012
American football teams disestablished in 2013
2012 establishments in Texas
2013 disestablishments in Texas